Decebal is a Romanian male given name. Notable people with the name include:

Decebal Gheară (born 1978), Romanian footballer
Decebal Traian Remeș (1949–2020), Romanian economist and politician

Romanian masculine given names